Redcliffe State High School is an independent co-educational public high school based in Redcliffe in Queensland, Australia. The school initially opened in 1958 on the eastern side of Oxley Avenue, with sporting facilities on the land adjacent. In order to meet growing demands, the school classroom facilities have since expanded onto the adjacent land across Oxley Avenue.

In 2019, some of the school's buildings were listed on the Queensland Heritage Register.

Curriculum

Excellence programs

Redcliffe State High School has Programs of Excellence in Visual & Media Arts, Drama, Humanities, Music, Rugby League, Girls' Sport & Fitness and Science Technology Engineering & Mathematics (STEM). There is also a Centre for Artistic Development (CAD) program available for senior Drama students.

Junior secondary

Years 7, 8 and 9 students at Redcliffe State High School follow a curriculum based on the Australian National Curriculum. Subjects of this curriculum include:
 English
 Mathematics
 Science
 Creative Industries (Art, Film and TV, Music and Drama)
 Languages Other Than English (Japanese)
 Health & Physical Education
 Technology (Digital Technology and Design Technology)

All Year 9 students undertake the four core subjects of English, Mathematics, Science and Humanities, as well as Health & Physical Education. Each Year 9 student also undertakes one elective subject, which include:
 Business Technology
 Design Technologies
 Digital Technologies
 Food Technologies
 Accelerated Music Program (Program of Excellence)
 Japanese
 Visual Art (Non-Excellence)
 Media Arts
 Science Technology Engineering & Maths (STEM)
 Drama (Program of Excellence)
 Visual Art/Media (Program of Excellence)

Year 10

All Year 10 students at Redcliffe State High School undertake one English and Mathematics class as well as one Science (Biology, Chemistry, Physics, Psychology or Studies of the Enrironment) or Technology (Digital Technology, Design Technology, Media or a Certificate I in Information Digital Media &
Technology and a Certificate I in Business) subject. Other subjects available to Year 10 students include:
 Health & Physical Education (Physical Education, Recreation, Girls Sport & Fitness Academy (GSFA), Rugby League Excellence)
 Hospitality (Food Technologies)
 Industrial Technology & Design (Certificate I Furnishing, Design Technologies)
 Japanese
 The Creative Industries (Visual Art, Visual Art in Practice, Media Arts in Practice, Film & Television, Drama Excellence, Music)
 Study of Society & Environment (History - Ancient & Modern, Geography, Legal Studies, Social & Community Studies & Tourism, Early Childhood)

Senior schooling (Years 11 & 12)

Redcliffe State High School offers a range of Queensland Curriculum and Assessment Authority (QCAA) and Vocational Education Training (VET) subjects for Years 11 & 12 students in the fields of English, Mathematics, Science, Health & Physical Education, Humanities, Design Technologies, The Arts, Business & Information Technologies and Languages Other Than English.

References

External links

 Official website

Public high schools in Queensland
Schools in South East Queensland
Educational institutions established in 1958
1958 establishments in Australia
Redcliffe, Queensland
Buildings and structures in Moreton Bay Region